Les Violons du Roy is a French-Canadian chamber orchestra based in Quebec City, Quebec.  The orchestra's principal venue is the Palais Montcalm in Québec City.  The orchestra also performs concerts in Montréal at the Place des Arts, the Montreal Museum of Fine Arts and St. James United Church. 

In 1984, Bernard Labadie founded the ensemble, following productions at the Université Laval of the Baroque operas Dido and Aeneas and L'incoronazione di Poppea, using the orchestra for these productions as the new ensemble's core.  The ensemble's name is an adaptation of the 17th century French royal court orchestra Les Vingt-quatre Violons du Roi.  Numbering 15 musicians, the orchestra performs on modern instruments, but incorporates period performance practice into its performances of music from the 17th and 18th centuries, including using duplicates of period bows for string instruments, and sparing use of vibrato.  Labadie founded an affiliate chorus for Les Violons du Roy in 1985, under the original name of Ensemble vocal Bernard Labadie.  In 1991, the choir changed its name to La Chapelle de Québec.

The ensemble first performed in Europe in 1988.  Its first performance in Washington, D.C. was in 1995.  The orchestra first appeared in New York City in August 1997.

Past conductors affiliated with the orchestra have included Jean-Marie Zeitouni, a past principal guest conductor, and Eric Paetkau, a former resident conductor.  Mathieu Lussier is the current associate conductor of the orchestra, and Anthony Marwood has the title of principal artistic partner.  With the 2014–2015 season, Labadie's title with the orchestra changed from music director to "founding conductor".  In October 2016, the orchestra announced the appointment of Jonathan Cohen as its next music director, effective with the 2017–2018 season.  Cohen is scheduled to take the title of music director designate in February 2017.

The orchestra has recorded commercially for the Dorian, Virgin Classics, and ATMA Classique labels.  The ensemble has won the Juno Award for Classical Album of the Year twice: for their recording of George Frideric Handel's Apollo e Dafne and Handel's Silete Venti in 2001, and for their recording of Wolfgang Amadeus Mozart's Requiem in 2003.

Music Directors
 Bernard Labadie (1984–2014)
 Jonathan Cohen (2017–present)

References

External links
 Official Les Violons du Roy homepage (French-language)
 Official Les Violons du Roy homepage (English-language)
 David Vernier, "Les Violons du Roy's 24-Karat Goldbergs", ClassicsToday.com article (undated)
 Carnegie Hall biography of Les Violons du Roy
 ATMA record label biography of Les Violons du Roy
 La Scena Musicale version of Les Violons du Roy press release on change of Labadie title (ensemble press release had no date), 8 July 2013 

Canadian orchestras
Chamber orchestras
Juno Award for Classical Album of the Year – Vocal or Choral Performance winners
Musical groups established in 1984
Musical groups from Quebec City